Otterness is a surname. Notable people with the surname include:

A. K. Otterness, American writer
Tom Otterness (born 1952), American sculptor